Northern Lights is a 2007 live album and DVD released in the US by Norwegian singer Sissel Kyrkjebø.

The CD and DVD is a live recording of a concert at Bergstadens Ziir ("Jewel of the mountain town" in German), a church from the 17th Century in Røros, Norway  (a 17th-Century Germany mining town). It was inspired by Norway’s winter, the Blue Hour, and the mystical Northern Lights.

The music were arranged by Kjetil Bjerkestrand and the musicians sharing the stage with Sissel were the Trondheim Soloists, the Nidaros Cathedral Girls Choir, and Sissel’s own band. The concert featured the tenor José Carreras, which performed the Julio Iglesias/Dolly Parton-duet "When You Tell Me That You Love Me" with Sissel.

Northern Lights reached #10 in the Billboard Classical Crossover album list.

Track listing

CD
 Hallowed Mountains
 Hymn To Winter  
 Jesu, Joy of Man's Desiring 
 Koppången     
 Sarah's Song    
 Your Sky  
 When Will My Heart Arise   
 Icelandic Lullaby   
 Ready To Go Home    
 Quando Sento Che Mi Ami (duet with José Carreras)   
 God Rest Ye Merry, Gentlemen
 Going Home

DVD
 Hallowed Mountains
 Hymn To Winter
 Jesu, Joy of Man's Desiring
 Sarah's Song
 Mitt hjerte alltid vanker
 Ave Maris Stella
 Like an Angel Passing Through My Room
 Der er ingenting i verden så stille som sne
 Amore Perduto José Carreras
 Quando Sento Che Mi Ami (duet with José Carreras) 
 In the Bleak Midwinter
 God Rest Ye Merry, Gentlemen
 Your Sky
 Ready To Go Home 
 Going Home
 
Bonus Tracks:
 Om kvelden
 Now the Day is Over (Jeg ved en lærkerede)

References 

www.sissel.net
www.discogs.com
www.rockipedia.no

Sissel Kyrkjebø albums
2007 live albums